Star Barn Complex, also known as the John Motter Barn and Outbuildings and "Walnut Hill," is a historic farm outbuilding complex located at Lower Swatara Township, Dauphin County, Pennsylvania.  It includes a large barn, pig barn (c. 1872), carriage house (c. 1872), chicken coop (c. 1872), grain silo, and milk house.  The main barn, known as the Star Barn, was built in 1872, and is a five bay, Gothic Revival style frame building.  It features an immense cupola atop a cross-gable roof.

It was added to the National Register of Historic Places in 2000.

Move to Lancaster County
The Star Barn was dismantled beginning in October 2015 and then moved to a site in Lancaster County where it is being reassembled and preserved at the Ironestone Ranch in Elizabethtown.

References

Barns on the National Register of Historic Places in Pennsylvania
Gothic Revival architecture in Pennsylvania
Infrastructure completed in 1872
Buildings and structures in Dauphin County, Pennsylvania
Barns in Pennsylvania
Relocated buildings and structures in Pennsylvania
National Register of Historic Places in Dauphin County, Pennsylvania

Homophobia